Frank Moss (17 April 1895 – 15 September 1965) was an English professional footballer who made over 250 appearances as a wing half in the Football League for Aston Villa. He was capped by England at international level and represented the Football League XI.

Club career 
After beginning his career in local Birmingham football, Moss joined First Division club Aston Villa for a £250 fee in February 1914 and made two appearances late in the 1914–15 season, but he had to wait until after the First World War before he could begin his professional career in earnest. During the war, Moss guested for Bellis and Morcom, Aston Park Rangers, Smethwick Carriage Works and Bradford City. He captained the club and was a part of the Villa teams which won the 1919–20 FA Cup and finished runners-up in 1923–24. After a dispute over a testimonial and a ban from the FA, Moss departed Villa Park in January 1929, after making 255 appearances and scoring 9 goals for the club. He finished the 1928–29 season with First Division club Cardiff City and left to join Birmingham Combination club Bromsgrove Rovers as player-manager for the 1929–30 season. Moss finished his career with Worcester City.

International career 
Moss won five caps for England at international level and represented the Football League XI.

Personal life 
Moss attended Burlington Street School in Aston and as of 1911 was working as a canal boatman. He later married and had four children, two of whom became footballers – Amos and Frank Jr. In November 1915, 15 months after Britain's entry into the First World War, Moss enlisted as a private in the Lincolnshire Regiment. He saw action during the Third Battle of Ypres and shrapnel wounds to his left knee saw him sent back to Britain to be a physical training instructor. Moss ended the war with the rank of corporal. A decade after being wounded in the war, Moss declined the shrapnel being removed from his knee at the same time as undergoing a knee cartilage operation relating to his football career. The shrapnel remained in his knee until his death in 1965. According to a 1939 register, Moss was the licensed victualler of a hostelry in Worcester.

Career statistics

Honours 
Aston Villa

 FA Cup: 1919–20

References 

1895 births
1965 deaths
English footballers
England international footballers
Aston Villa F.C. players
English Football League players
English Football League representative players
British Army personnel of World War I
Association football wing halves
Royal Lincolnshire Regiment soldiers
Cardiff City F.C. players
Worcester City F.C. players
Walsall F.C. players
English football managers
FA Cup Final players
Military personnel from Birmingham, West Midlands
Bromsgrove Rovers F.C. players
Bromsgrove Rovers F.C. managers
Bradford City A.F.C. wartime guest players